Saint Brigid of Kildare Monastery is a double monastery of the United Methodist Church located in St. Joseph, Minnesota, United States.

The guiding sources for the monastery include the Holy Bible, the Rule of Saint Benedict, the Benedictine Breviary, and Methodist texts such as The United Methodist Hymnal, The Book of Discipline, and the writings of John Wesley.

Consultations to explore the possibility of creating an ecumenical monastic community began in 1984 and led to the founding in 1999 of Saint Brigid of Kildare Monastery by Sister Mary Ewing Stamps, OSB, as a Methodist-Benedictine monastery for United Methodist women. 
 
The monastery was dedicated on the feast day of Saint Brigid in 2000 and by 2011 counted 16 members (14 Methodists), some ordained, both women and men, ranging in age from 23 to 82 years.

References

External links
Saint Brigid of Kildare Monastery
Sister Mary Ewing Stamps, OSB, on Blogspot

Christian monasteries in the United States
Methodist monasteries